William Henry Hurley (born 11 December 1959 in Leytonstone, London Borough of Waltham Forest) is an English former professional footballer who played in the Football League, as a forward.

As a 17-year-old, Hurley was named in the Orient squad against Chelsea in April 1977. He was also named in the team list in 1976 after apparing nine times for England's schoolboy squad.

References

1959 births
Living people
Footballers from Leytonstone
English footballers
Association football forwards
Leyton Orient F.C. players
English Football League players